Statistics of 1. deild in the 2002 season.

Overview
It was contested by 10 teams, and Havnar Bóltfelag won the championship.

League standings

Results
The schedule consisted of a total of 18 games. Each team played two games against every opponent in no particular order. One of the games was at home and one was away.

Top goalscorers
Source: faroesoccer.com

18 goals
 Andrew av Fløtum (HB)

15 goals
 John Petersen (B36)

12 goals
 Jón Rói Jacobsen (HB)

11 goals
 Hjalgrím Elttør (KÍ)
 Øssur Hansen (B68)

9 goals
 Sámal Joensen (GÍ)

8 goals
 Heðin á Lakjuni (KÍ)
 Kurt Mørkøre (KÍ)

1. deild seasons
Faroe
Faroe
1